West Preston Lakeside Football Club is an Australian rules football club in Reservoir, Victoria, currently competing in the Northern Football League.

History
The West Preston F.C. was formed in 1948 in the CYMS competition. It remained there until 1963, when it joined the very strong church based YCW National Football Association.

The club had a reasonable amount of success and it was decided that it should field junior sides as well and from those early days more than 10 players from those sides went on to join the ranks of the then VFL.

The club had continued to grow which led the club to apply for membership in the Diamond Valley Football League in 1981. The DVFL was one of, if not the strongest of Melbourne's suburban competitions and thus the successful application was a great moment for the club.

Since 1981 the club has won 9 Senior and 6 junior Premierships and provided 18 Best and Fairest winners in the DVFL. In 1988 and again in 1993 it won the Div. 2 A Grade flag and promotion to Div. 1, only to return to Div. 2 the year after failing both times in the very strong First Division.

In 1996 the club was again successful in winning both the A and B Grade Premierships, however this time the club remained in the top level.

West Preston joined Reservoir Lakeside in the DVFL; the Lakies had already been playing in the league since World War II and had achieved significant success including three Division 1 A  Grade Premierships.

On 23 March 1998 members of both the West Preston FC (Roosters)and Reservoir Lakeside FC (Lakies) met and voted on a merger of the two clubs as Lakies who had just competed in the Division 2 finals were struggling to field sides. Reservoir Lakeside was to bring with it a steeped history with three A Grade Premierships and a total of 20 senior pennants as well as 20 competition Best and Fairest winners.

From this day on the West Preston Lakeside FC Inc. emerged and continued to be known as the Roosters and Lakies returned to J.E. Moore Park, Preston. The merged club had immediate success In the first season this new entity missed out on the finals by only one game, and a similar result in 1999. Season 2000 the club finished on top of the ladder only to be beaten in the Grand Final by Northcote Park. In 2003 against Montmorency secured its first Premiership as a merged entity.

In 2010, West Preston Lakeside won its second Premiership as a merged entity, beating heavy favourite Heidelberg, whom had won the past 4 Grand Finals.
In 2018, West Preston Lakeside WON the Premiership, defeating Macleod by 9 points.   

In addition the club has a strong commitment to junior football, fielding nine teams as the West Preston Junior F.C along with an association with Preston YCW Cricket Club.

West Preston Lakeside – Founded 1998

Premierships

Honour Board

West Preston – Founded 1948

Premierships

Honour Board

Reservoir Lakeside – Founded 1947

In Round 18 2012, West Preston-Lakeside wore a Reservoir-Lakeside Jumper to commemorate 'Lakies Day'. The jumper was the same jumper worn by the Lakies before the merger with West Preston.

Premierships

External links

 http://www.westprestonlakesidefc.com.au/
 http://www.nfl.org.au
 http://www.nfl.org.au/index.php?id=23&tx_ttnews%5Byear%5D=2012&tx_ttnews%5Bmonth%5D=08&tx_ttnews%5Btt_news%5D=291&cHash=1665415fb70fadd4edb45b175634398e

Northern Football League (Australia) clubs
Australian rules football clubs established in 1998
1998 establishments in Australia
Sport in the City of Darebin
Australian rules football clubs in Melbourne